VEBA AG (originally from Vereinigte Elektrizitäts und Bergwerks Aktiengesellschaft or "United Electricity and Mining Corporation") was a German state owned energy company. VEBA was founded in 1929 as a holding company owned by the state of Prussia, and was privatized in 1965. In December 1982, VEBA signed a cooperation agreement with the Petróleos de Venezuela (PDVSA) for the establishment of a Joint Venture Ruhr Oel GmbH. VEBA became a part of E.ON in 2000.

External links

 

E.ON
Defunct companies of Germany
Electric power companies of Germany
Companies based in Düsseldorf
Energy companies established in 1929
1929 establishments in Germany
Telecommunications companies established in 1929